Idols South Africa IX is the ninth season of South African reality interactive talent show based on the British talent show Pop Idol.

After the auditions, call backs were held in Sun City for the golden ticket holders.

Regional auditions 
Auditions began in February 2013, and were held in the following cities:

Top 16 Show 

Top 8 Males

15 September 2013

Top 8 Females

22 September 2013

Top 10 

The top ten performed on 29 September 2013.

References

External links
 Idols website

Season 9
2013 South African television seasons